Panadura Urban Council is the local authority for Panadura and its surrounding suburbs in Kalutara District, Sri Lanka. It has 18 members elected under the mixed electoral system where 60% of members are elected using first-past-the-post voting and the remaining 40% through closed list proportional representation.

History 

The Panadura District Town Council was established by a Gazette dated 13 January 1922. Previously, there had been a local governance institution called the Sanitary Board. The newly established Town Council met for the first time in January 1923 at the Panadura Sanitary Board Inspector's office. Dr. E. S. Gunawardena was the first Chairman of a council which comprised six wards and nine councillors. There have been 23 chairpersons in its  year history.

Geography 

The council grew from six to ten wards, and the council boundaries expanded over time with various Gazette notifications. Currently, the council governs an area of  covering 19 Grama Niladhari divisions,  with a total population of 35,803, and 24,166 electors.

Low lying wet zone land takes up 8.03% of the total land area, and common crops include rice, rubber, tea, coconut, and fruits and vegetables.

Wards 

For electoral and administrative purposes, the Council is divided into 10 wards.

 Walana
 Udahamulla
 Pattiya North
 Bazaar Street
 Walapala Pattiya
 Wekada North
 Wekada West
 Pattiya South
 Nallooruwa North
 Nallooruwa

External links 
 Urban Development Authority - Panadura Zoning Plan
 Ward Map of Panadura Urban Council - Kalutara District

References

Local authorities in Western Province, Sri Lanka
Urban councils of Sri Lanka